The Ballad of Lawless Soirez is the solo debut album of Louisiana musician Gill Landry, released in 2007 by Nettwerk Records.

External links
PopMatters review

2007 debut albums